In baseball, an assist (denoted by A) is a defensive statistic, baseball being one of the few sports in which the defensive team controls the ball. An assist is credited to every defensive player who fields or touches the ball (after it has been hit by the batter) before the recording of a putout, even if the contact was unintentional. For example, if a ball strikes a player's leg and bounces off him to another fielder, who tags the baserunner, the first player is credited with an assist. A fielder can receive a maximum of one assist per out recorded. An assist is also credited if a putout would have occurred, had another fielder not committed an error. For example, a shortstop might field a ground ball cleanly, but the first baseman might drop his throw. In this case, an error would be charged to the first baseman, and the shortstop would be credited with an assist. Unlike putouts, exactly one of which is awarded for every defensive out, an out can result in no assists being credited (as in strikeouts, fly outs and line drives), or in assists being credited to multiple players (as in relay throws and rundown plays). First base, or 1B, is the first of four stations on a baseball diamond which must be touched in succession by a baserunner in order to score a run for that player's team. A first baseman is the player on the team playing defense who fields the area nearest first base and is responsible for the majority of plays made at that base. In the numbering system used to record defensive plays, the first baseman is assigned the number 3.

First basemen are most commonly credited with an assist when they field a ground ball and either throw the ball to the pitcher covering first base to retire the batter/runner or throw the ball to the shortstop covering the second base to force out a runner, perhaps beginning a double play. Other common ways in which first basemen gain an assist are by throwing out a runner attempting to reach third base or score, perhaps on a relay throw from the right fielder, throwing out a runner attempting to score on a squeeze play, rundown plays in which a runner is stranded between bases, throwing out a runner attempting to steal second base on a pickoff throw, and throwing to second base after catching a line drive to retire a runner before they can tag up. First basemen typically accumulate less than half as many assists as other infielders, partially because the ball is less frequently batted to the right side of the field, but also because in situations with a runner on first base, the first baseman will typically be stationed on or close to the bag to receiver a pickoff throw, reducing the area of the infield which they can easily cover. Because a right-handed first baseman needs to turn their body before throwing across the infield, left-handed first basemen are often preferred for defensive purposes; 10 of the top 14 career assist leaders are left-handed.

Eddie Murray is the all-time leader with 1,865 career assists. Only 57 first basemen have recorded 1,000 or more career assists, with Joey Votto and Albert Pujols being the only two active.

Key

List

Stats updated as of the end of the 2022 season.

Other Hall of Famers

Notes

References

External links

Major League Baseball statistics
Assists as a first baseman